Dorchester was a parliamentary constituency centred on the town of Dorchester in Dorset.  It returned two Members of Parliament to the House of Commons of the Parliament of the United Kingdom from 1295 to 1868, when its representation was reduced one member.

The constituency was abolished by the Redistribution of Seats Act 1885, after which Dorchester was placed in the new Dorset South constituency.  In 1918 it was transferred to Dorset West, where it has remained since.

Members of Parliament

1295-1629

1640-1868

1868-1885

Election results

Elections in the 1830s

 

 

 

Ashley-Cooper resigned, causing a by-election.

Elections in the 1840s

 

Graham was appointed Home Secretary, requiring a by-election.

Elections in the 1850s

 
 

 

Sturt resigned in order to contest the 1856 by-election in Dorset, causing a by-election.

Elections in the 1860s

 

 

Seat reduced to one member

Elections in the 1870s

Elections in the 1880s

Notes

References 
Robert Beatson, A Chronological Register of Both Houses of Parliament (London: Longman, Hurst, Res & Orme, 1807) 
D Brunton & D H Pennington, Members of the Long Parliament (London: George Allen & Unwin, 1954)
Cobbett's Parliamentary history of England, from the Norman Conquest in 1066 to the year 1803 (London: Thomas Hansard, 1808) 
F W S Craig, British Parliamentary Election Results 1832-1885 (2nd edition, Aldershot: Parliamentary Research Services, 1989)
 Maija Jansson (ed.), Proceedings in Parliament, 1614 (House of Commons) (Philadelphia: American Philosophical Society, 1988)
 J E Neale, The Elizabethan House of Commons (London: Jonathan Cape, 1949)
M Stenton (ed), Who's Who of British Members of Parliament: Volume I 1832-1885 (The Harvester Press, 1976)
 

Parliamentary constituencies in Dorset (historic)
Constituencies of the Parliament of the United Kingdom established in 1295
Constituencies of the Parliament of the United Kingdom disestablished in 1885
History of Dorchester, Dorset